Robert Flint was a theologian.

Robert Flint may also refer to:

Bob Flint, American ceramic artist
Robert Flint (MP) (fl. 1547), MP for Thirsk
Robert Flynt of Gray's Inn

See also
Robert Flynn (disambiguation)